DGA Essais de missiles (previously named Centre d'Essais des Landes) is a launch site for the test of military rockets and for launching sounding rockets in France. "DGA Essais de missiles" went in service in 1967 as replacement for the former launch sites at Hammaguir.

External links
 Description of the launch site (in French)
 Satellite picture

Rocket launch sites